Ki Eshm'ra Shabbat is a popular Sabbath hymn, composed in the 12th-century by Abraham ibn Ezra. Though historically a song for Sabbath eve, today it is usually sung at Sabbath lunch.

The hymn discusses which acts are appropriate, and which inappropriate, for the Sabbath. It contains five stanzas, the first letters of which spell the author's first name "Abraham" by acrostic. The refrain is "Because I will keep the Sabbath, God will protect me; it is an eternal sign between Him and me".

Form 

The piyyut is in an a/a/b/b/b/a form. Its meter appears thus: [— — ◡ — — — | — — ◡ — —]. Depending on the tune used, it may be classified as a zajal.

Text

In Jewish culture
The poem has historically been a locus of intercommunal Rabbanite-Karaite dissent. Ibn Ezra, a Rabbinic Jew who opposed Karaite Judaism, incorporated some of his anti-Karaite beliefs in the text, visible primarily in the lyrics exhorting joy and pleasure on Shabbat (whereas Karaite doctrine requires a sombre and mournful approach on the sabbath, out of reverence for the loss of Jerusalem and the exile of Jews from their homeland). However, the piyyut remained popular among Karaites, and some Karaite prayerbooks changed the lyrics of the piyyut to better reflect their doctrine. For example, a Karaite version states that "the ones who have intercourse on [Shabbat] are retrograde," in opposition to the Rabbinic stance that intimacy on Shabbat is a mitzvah - the Karaite position is that sex constitutes work, which is forbidden on the sabbath.

In January 2021, Twitter user @NoahRoth observed that a well-known tune for the piyyut is nearly identical to an Ottoman-era military anthem, Sivastopol Marşı, composed by Rifat Bey. The melody is popular in Ashkenazi and Sefardi communities in Israel and in the diaspora, but the connection to the Ottoman military had apparently been forgotten.

References 

Zemirot
Medieval poetry
Shabbat